Miskat Mountains also known as Mishkat, is a mountain range in the northeastern region of Bari, Somalia. Aloe miskatana which occurs in the mountain range is named after it.

Since 2017, the mountain range has been occupied by and serves as the headquarters of IS-S, a Jihadist group fighting in the Somali Civil War (2009-present).

See also
Cal Madow
Karkaar

References

Puntland
Mountain ranges of Somalia